Bobby Biemans (born 30 January 1982) is a former Dutch professional darts player who has played in Professional Darts Corporation events.

Biemans qualified for the 2013 European Darts Open on the PDC European Tour, but lost his first round match to Wayne Jones.

References

External links

Dutch darts players
1982 births
Living people
Professional Darts Corporation associate players